Anarta mendax is a species of moth of the family Noctuidae. It is found in the south-eastern Balkans, Turkey, Israel, Lebanon and Transcaucasia.

Adults are on wing from April to May. There is one generation per year.

Subspecies
Anarta mendax mendax
Anarta mendax occidentalis
Anarta mendax phoenicica

References

External links 
 Hadeninae of Israel

mendax
Moths described in 1879
Moths of Europe
Moths of the Middle East